Semmy Friedmann (14 September 1891 – 13 January 1964) was a Swedish actor. He had roles in multiple films between the years 1916 and 1963.

Filmography
 Ålderdom och dårskap (1916) - Kaj
 Hans nåds testamente (1919) - Jacob
 A Fortune Hunter (1921) - Henri de Bresignac
 Thomas Graal's Ward (1922) - Student
 The People of Simlang Valley (1924) - Tattar-Jan
 Pettersson & Bendel (1933) - Josef Bendel
 Simon of Backabo (1934) - Dicke Lundén
 Kungen kommer (1936) - Italian pyrotechnist
 The Girls of Uppakra (1936) - Eric Dahlberg
 Dance, My Doll (1953) - Berg
 Den gula bilen (1963) - Ambassador Leclerc

References

1891 births
1964 deaths
Swedish male stage actors
Swedish male film actors
Swedish male silent film actors
Swedish male television actors
20th-century Swedish male actors
People from Kristianstad Municipality
Swedish Jews